Bagh Abbas may refer to:
 Bagh Abbas, Razavi Khorasan